Abijah Joslyn Wellman (May 6, 1836 in Friendship, Allegany County, New York – June 8, 1889 in Friendship, Allegany Co., NY) was an American merchant, banker and politician from New York.

Life
He was the son of Jonas Wellman MD (died 1844) and Keziah (Joslyn) Wellman (died 1880). He attended Oberlin College from 1854 to 1855. Then he became a merchant, and later a banker.

At the beginning of the American Civil War, he was appointed as captain of the 85th New York Volunteers and was later promoted to lieutenant colonel. He fought in the Battle of Seven Pines and was severely wounded in the chest.

In 1863, he married Kate Miner (1842–1926), and they had five children. From 1864 on, he also engaged in the lumber trade.

He was Supervisor of the Town of Friendship from 1866 to 1872; Chairman of the Board of Supervisors of Allegany County for three years; a delegate to the 1872 Republican National Convention; and a member of the New York State Senate (30th D.) from 1874 to 1877, sitting in the 97th, 98th, 99th and 100th New York State Legislatures.

He was Cashier of the First National Bank of Friendship for nearly 25 years and died at his home in Friendship after suffering for a long time from sequels of his war wound. He was buried at the Mount Hope Cemetery.

Sources
 Life Sketches of Government Officers and Members of the Legislature of the State of New York in 1875 by W. H. McElroy and Alexander McBride (pg. 110ff) [e-book]
 OBITUARY NOTES; Ex-Senator Abijah J. Wellman... in NYT on June 9, 1889
 Wellman genealogy at Gen Forum

External links

 The 85th NY Volunteers Infantry

1836 births
1889 deaths
Republican Party New York (state) state senators
People from Friendship, New York
Oberlin College alumni
Union Army officers
19th-century American politicians